The 1985 North America cold wave was a meteorological event which occurred in January, 1985, as a result of the shifting of the polar vortex farther south than is normally seen. Blocked from its normal movement, polar air from the north pushed into nearly every section of the central and eastern half of the United States and Canada, shattering record low temperature records in a number of areas. This was preceded by unusually warm weather in the eastern U.S. in December, 1984, suggesting that there was a build-up of cold air that was suddenly released from the Arctic, a meteorological event known as a mobile polar high.

Meteorological synopsis
From Sunday, January 20, 1985, until Tuesday, January 22, 1985, the polar vortex, coupled with a large ridge of high pressure, moved polar air into the United States as far south as Arizona, Texas, and northern Florida. Unlike with cold-air systems, a pattern of self-modification did not immediately occur, and seasonable temperatures were absent for a number of days, a rarity in forecasting.

The Arctic air mass started moving into the United States on the evening of January 19 and into the morning of January 20, 1985. In Cincinnati, Ohio, the morning temperature of  tied for the fourth-lowest minimum temperature in the city's history, outdone by a cold mass the year before and a blizzard in 1977.

As the cold air mass moved southeastward, it modified only slightly, resulting in frigid air for most of the East Coast of the United States starting on the morning of January 21, 1985.

Impact and aftermath
The cold wave of January 1985 resulted in multiple human fatalities, the deaths of many wild and domesticated animals, massive crop losses, and infrastructure damage to homes, municipality sites and industrial sites. At least 126 deaths were recorded as being due to the cold wave of 1985. Approximately 90% of the citrus crops in Florida were destroyed, in what the state called the "Freeze of the Century," resulting in Florida's citrus industry suffering $1.2 billion in losses ($2.68 billion in 2016 dollars).

The second presidential inauguration of U.S. President Ronald Reagan was held in the United States Capitol Rotunda instead of outside, due to the cold weather, and the inaugural parade was cancelled. Since Inauguration Day fell on a Sunday, Ronald Reagan took a private oath on January 20, 1985, and the semi-public oath on January 21, 1985.

References 

1985 natural disasters in the United States
1985 cold waves
1985
1985